The year 613 BC was a year of the pre-Julian Roman calendar. In the Roman Empire, it was known as year 141 Ab urbe condita . The denomination 613 BC for this year has been used since the early medieval period, when the Anno Domini calendar era became the prevalent method in Europe for naming years.

Events
 King Zhuang of Chu becomes king of Chu in China.

Births

Deaths
 She (Qi), temporary ruler of the state of Qi
 King Qing of Zhou, king of the Chinese Zhou Dynasty
 Duke Zhao of Qi, ruler of Qi

References